The 1960 WANFL season was the 76th season of the various incarnations of the Western Australian National Football League.

Ladder

Finals

Grand Final

References

External links
Official WAFL website

West Australian Football League seasons
WANFL